José Antonio Díez Arriola (born August 13, 1982) is a Spanish professional racing cyclist. He won several nation cyclo-cross races. On the international level he competed between 2011 and 2013 five times in a UCI Cyclo-cross World Cup race, with 34th place as best result.

Career highlights

 2003: 1st in Zeberio, Cyclo-cross (ESP)
 2004: 1st in Camp de Mirra, Cyclo-cross (ESP)
 2005: 1st in Medina de Pomar, Cyclo-cross (ESP)
 2005: 1st in Polanco, Cyclo-cross (ESP)
 2006: 1st in Rasines, Cyclo-cross (ESP)
 2006: 1st in Asterria, Cyclo-cross (ESP)
 2006: 1st in Treto, Cyclo-cross (ESP)
 2006: 1st in Ermua, Cyclo-cross (ESP)
 2006: 1st in Rada, Cyclo-cross (ESP)
 2006: 1st in Solares, Cyclo-cross (ESP)
 2006: 1st in Ramales, Cyclo-cross (ESP)

References

External links

1982 births
Living people
Spanish male cyclists
Cyclo-cross cyclists
People from Castro Urdiales
Cyclists from Cantabria